William Butterworth (December 18, 1864 - June 1, 1936) served as both president and chairman of Deere & Company.

Biography
Butterworth was born in Maineville, Ohio, and graduated from Lehigh University and studied law at the National University School of Law in Washington D.C.

In 1892 Butterworth married Katherine Deere, daughter of Charles Deere (and granddaughter of John Deere).  He joined Deere & Company the same year as an assistant buyer.  In 1897 he was elected treasurer, and became president after the death of Charles Deere in 1907.

Deere & Company underwent many changes during Butterworth's tenure.  In 1910 the board of directors reorganized the company's factories into one unified entity, giving birth to the modern Deere & Company.  In 1912 Deere began manufacturing combine harvesters. In 1918 the company purchased Waterloo Gasoline Engine Company and the rights to produce their tractors.  Butterworth also implemented a pension system and a benefit and disability program for Deere & Company's employees.

Butterworth retired in 1928 and became the first Chairman of Deere & Company's board, a position he held until his death in 1936.

References

1864 births
1936 deaths
American chief executives of manufacturing companies
People from Warren County, Ohio
People from Moline, Illinois
Lehigh University alumni
National University School of Law alumni